Nebria agilis is a species of ground beetle from Nebriinae subfamily that is endemic to Yunnan, province of China.

References

Beetles described in 1996
Beetles of Asia
Endemic fauna of Yunnan
agilis